Henry Willoughby (1640–1669) was an English military officer, the Governor of Barbados (1664–1666) and Antigua (1667–1670).

He was the fifth son of William Willoughby, 6th Baron Willoughby of Parham.

References
Cracroft's Peerage for vital dates

External links
The Discription of Guyana by Major John Scott (1669), manuscript

1640 births
1669 deaths
Governors of Barbados
Younger sons of barons
17th-century English military personnel
Governors of Antigua and Barbuda